Shubha may refer to:
 Shubha (Arabic), doubt, obscurity, suspicion or mis-grounded conceit
 Shubha (Hindi), a Hindi word that means auspicious
 Shubha (film), a 2006 film
 Shubha (actress), Indian film actress mainly in Malayalam films